The 2022 Challenger Temuco was a professional tennis tournament played on hard courts. It was the 1st edition of the tournament which was part of the 2022 ATP Challenger Tour. It took place in Temuco, Chile between 21 and 27 November 2022.

Singles main-draw entrants

Seeds

 1 Rankings are as of 14 November 2022.

Other entrants
The following players received wildcards into the singles main draw:
  Nicolás Bruna
  Juan Ignacio Galarza
  Juan Bautista Otegui

The following players received entry from the qualifying draw:
  Guido Andreozzi
  Alafia Ayeni
  Tomás Farjat
  Tomás Lipovšek Puches
  Federico Zeballos
  Matías Zukas

The following player received entry as a lucky loser:
  Blaise Bicknell

Champions

Singles

 Guido Andreozzi def.  Nicolás Kicker 4–6, 6–4, 6–2.

Doubles

 Guido Andreozzi /  Guillermo Durán def.  Luis David Martínez /  Jeevan Nedunchezhiyan 6–4, 6–2.

References

2022 ATP Challenger Tour
2022 in Chilean tennis
November 2022 sports events in Chile